Liang may refer to:

Chinese history
 Liang (state) (梁) (8th century BC – 641 BC), a Spring and Autumn period state
 Wei (state) (403–225  BC), a Warring States period state, also known as Liang (梁) after moving its capital to Daliang
 Kaifeng, a city formerly known as Daliang (大梁)
 Liang (realm) (梁), a fief held by various princes under imperial China
 Liang (Han dynasty kingdom) (梁), a kingdom/principality in the Han dynasty
 Liang Province (涼州), an administrative division in ancient China covering present-day Gansu, Ningxia, and parts of Qinghai, Xinjiang, and Inner Mongolia
 Former Liang (涼) (320–376), one of the Sixteen Kingdoms
 Later Liang (Sixteen Kingdoms) (涼) (386–403), one of the Sixteen Kingdoms
 Southern Liang (Sixteen Kingdoms) (涼) (397–414), one of the Sixteen Kingdoms
 Northern Liang (涼) (397–439), one of the Sixteen Kingdoms
 Western Liang (Sixteen Kingdoms) (涼) (400–421), one of the Sixteen Kingdoms
 Liang dynasty (梁) (502–557), a state during the Southern and Northern Dynasties period, also known as Southern Liang
 Western Liang (555–587), a puppet state during the Northern and Southern dynasties period
 Liang (梁) (617–621), a state founded by Xiao Xian at the end of the Sui dynasty
 Liang (梁) (617–628), a state founded by Liang Shidu at the end of the Sui dynasty
 Liang (涼) (618–619), a state founded by Li Gui at the end of the Sui dynasty
 Later Liang (Five Dynasties) (梁) (907–923), a state during the Five Dynasties and Ten Kingdoms period

Other uses
 Mukim Liang, a mukim of Brunei
 Liang (surname) (梁), a Chinese surname
 Tael, a traditional East Asian unit of weight
 Liang, a barangay in Malolos, Philippines
 Liang Island, Beigan Township, Lienchiang County (Matsu Islands), Taiwan (Republic of China)